Sylescaptia is a genus of moths in the subfamily Arctiinae.

Species
 Sylescaptia ambarawae van Eecke, 1920
 Sylescaptia tigrina van Eecke, 1920

References

Natural History Museum Lepidoptera generic names catalog

Lithosiini